Fludroxycortide (INN, BAN, JAN), also known as flurandrenolide (USAN) and flurandrenolone, is a synthetic topical corticosteroid and is used as an anti-inflammatory treatment for use on skin irritations. Trade names include Haelan (Typharm, UK) and Cordran (by Watson Pharmaceuticals, US).

Fludroxycortide is available in ointment, cream and as an impregnated tape (Haelan tape, Cordran tape). Licensed indications in the United Kingdom include recalcitrant dermatoses.

References 

Acetonides
Primary alcohols
Cyclohexanols
Corticosteroid cyclic ketals
Corticosteroids
Diketones
Fluoroarenes
Glucocorticoids
Pregnanes